Domenico Morelli (1642–1716) was a Roman Catholic prelate who served as Bishop of Lucera (1688–1716).

Biography
Domenico Morelli was born in Foggia, Italy on 29 March 1642 and ordained a priest on 4 April 1665.
On 17 May 1688, he was appointed during the papacy of Pope Innocent XI as Bishop of Lucera.
On 23 May 1688, he was consecrated bishop by Marcantonio Barbarigo, Bishop of Corneto e Montefiascone, with Pietro de Torres, Archbishop of Dubrovnik, and Costanzo Zani, Bishop of Imola, serving as co-consecrators. 
He served as Bishop of Lucera until his death in 1716.

References

External links and additional sources
 (for Chronology of Bishops)  
 (for Chronology of Bishops)  

17th-century Italian Roman Catholic bishops
18th-century Italian Roman Catholic bishops
Bishops appointed by Pope Innocent XI
1642 births
1716 deaths